The National Assembly is the lower chamber of Lesotho's bicameral Parliament.

Composition
The current National Assembly has a total of 120 members. 80 members are elected in single member constituencies using the simple majority (or First-past-the-post) system. The remaining 40 members are elected through proportional representation and national party-lists. Members serve five-year terms.

Tlohang Sekhamane is the current Speaker of the National Assembly.

Latest election

See also
Senate of Lesotho - the upper chamber of Parliament
History of Lesotho
List of speakers of the National Assembly of Lesotho

References

External links
 

Government of Lesotho
Lesotho
1965 establishments in Basutoland